Silacayoapan is one of the more extensive Mixtec languages. It is spoken by 150,000 people in Puebla and across the border in Guerrero, as well as by emigrants to the United States.

Dialects
Egland & Bartholomew found six dialects (with > ≈80% internal intelligibility) which had about 70% mutual intelligibility with each other:

 Metlatónoc (Metlatónoc, San Rafael, Tlacoachistlahuaca, Cochoapa), Alcozauca (Alcozauca, Xochapa, Petlacalancingo)
 Portezuelo (Santos Reyes Yucuná, Guadalupe Portezuelo, San Simón Zahuatlán)
 Coicoyán (San Martín Peras Cuatzoquitengo, Río Frijol, Santa Cruz Yucucani, San José Yoxocaño, Malvabisco, Rancho Limón, Río Aguacate, Boca de Mamey)
(varieties within ≈75% of Silacayoapan proper)
 Juxtlahuaca (San Sebastián Tecomaxtlahuaca, San Miguel Tlacotepec, Santos Reyes Tepejillo, Santa María Tindú, San Martín Duraznos)
 Alacatlatzala (Alacatlatzala, Cahuatache, Tenaztalcingo, Jilotepec, Zacatipa, Tototepec, Cuba Libre, San Isidro Labrador, Quiahuitlatlatzala, Xonacatlán, Tepecocatlán, Cuautipa, Ocuapa, Potoichan)
 Silacayoapan 
 Silacayoapan proper (Santo Domingo Tonalá, San Jorge Nuchita)
 Tezoatlán (Yucuquimi de Ocampo, San Andrés Yutatío, Yucuñuti de Benito Juárez, San Juan Diquiyú, San Marcos de Garzón, San Martín del Río, Santa Catarina Yotandú, San Isidro de Zaragoza, San Valentín de Gomez)
 (other towns) Ixpantepec Nieves, Santiago Tamazola, Atenango, San Miguel Ahuehuetitlán

Ethnologue counts (Santa María) Yucunicoco Mixtec with Juxtlahuaca Mixtec. However, Egland & Bartholomew found it to have only 50% intelligible with Juxtlahuaca. Comprehension of Mixtepec is 85%, but in the other direction only 45%.

Phonology

Consonants

Vowels

Further reading

References

Sources 
 Shields, Jäna K. 1988. A syntactic sketch of Silacayoapan Mixtec. In C. Henry Bradley & Barbara E. Hollenbach (eds.) Studies in the syntax of Mixtecan languages, vol. 1. Dallas: Summer Institute of Linguistics; [Arlington:] University of Texas at Arlington, pp. 305–449.
 Tezoatlán Mixtec (SIL-Mexico)

External links 

Mixtec language